Ingiburga of Sweden - Swedish: Ingeborg (also legal spelling after 1900) - may refer to:

Ingeborg Eriksdotter of Sweden or Ingiburga, Swedish princess around 1212
Ingiburga, Swedish princess around 1253, married John I, Duke of Saxony
Ingeborg of Sweden (1263–1292), Swedish princess 1263, daughter of King Waldemar
Ingeborg Magnusdotter of Sweden, Swedish princess 1277
Ingeborg of Norway, Swedish princess consort and duchess 1312
Ingeborg Eriksdottir of Norway, Swedish princess consort and duchess 1312
Ingiburga, Swedish princess consort 14th century, daughter-in-law of King Valdemar of Sweden
Princess Ingeborg of Denmark, Swedish princess consort and duchess 1897